Milford State Park is located northwest of Junction City, Kansas, United States, on the southeast shore of Milford Reservoir, the largest lake in Kansas. The lake is formed by Milford Dam. The park is used by anglers seeking walleye, crappie, large mouth bass, white bass, catfish, and small mouth bass as well as for wildlife photography and game hunters. Area game include quail, pheasant, prairie chicken, duck, goose, rabbit, turkey, deer, and squirrel while trappers pursue raccoon, muskrat, and beaver. There are 19,000 acres of public land around the park and the  Steve Lloyd refuge, Milford Nature Center, and (below the dam) the Milford Fish Hatchery are nearby.

References

External links
U.S. Geological Survey Map at the U.S. Geological Survey Map Website. Retrieved January 9th, 2022.

State parks of Kansas
Protected areas of Geary County, Kansas
Tourist attractions in Geary County, Kansas